Daaden-Herdorf (before January 2017: Herdorf-Daaden ) is a Verbandsgemeinde ("collective municipality") in the district of Altenkirchen, in Rhineland-Palatinate, Germany. It was formed on 1 July 2014, when the town Herdorf joined the former Verbandsgemeinde Daaden. The seat of the Verbandsgemeinde is in Daaden.

The Verbandsgemeinde Daaden-Herdorf consists of the following 10 Ortsgemeinden ("local municipalities"):

* seat of the Verbandsgemeinde

References 

Verbandsgemeinde in Rhineland-Palatinate